The 1952 Giro d'Italia was the 35th edition of the Giro d'Italia, one of cycling's Grand Tours. The Giro started off in Milan on 17 May with a  flat stage and concluded back in Milan with a  relatively flat mass-start stage on 8 June. Sixteen teams entered the race, which was won by Italian Fausto Coppi of the Bianchi team. Second and third respectively were Italian Fiorenzo Magni and Swiss rider Ferdinand Kübler.

Teams

Nineteen teams were invited by the race organizers to participate in the 1952 edition of the Giro d'Italia, but only seventeen accepted the invitation. The Paglianti team, assigned bib numbers 71 to 77, did not start, so the Giro started with sixteen teams. Each team sent a squad of seven riders, which meant that the race started with a peloton of 112 cyclists. From the riders that began the race, 98 made it to the finish in Milan.

The teams entering the race were:

  
  
  
  
Bianchi
 
 
 

Garin
 
Guerra
 
Nilux

Pre-race favorites

The "Big Three" of Italian cycling started the race and were all seen as strong favorites to win the race. Reigning champion Fiorenzo Magni (Ganna) started the race with hopes of winning the race a third time (He also won in 1948). Three-time champion (1940, 1947, & 1949) Fausto Coppi (Bianchi). Gino Bartali (Bartali) made his twelfth start at the race, with a history of winning the race three times (1936, 1937, & 1946) and four second-place finishes.

Due to the participation of several strong riders at the time, including many non-Italian riders, at the race was thought to be very competitive and the event growing into a more international event. Current Swiss road race champion and world road race champion Ferdinand Kübler (Fiorelli) started the race. Kübler entered the race after having won two of the three races comprising the Ardennes classics that took place in early May (Liège–Bastogne–Liège and La Flèche Wallonne). He was seen as a strong favorite to contend for the general classification, along with having a strong team in support. Hugo Koblet (Guerra), who won the 1950 Giro d'Italia, started the race. Attilio Camoriano of l'Unità wrote that Koblet could be a threat in the race if he was not using it as preparation for the upcoming Tour de France. The previous year's runner-up Rik Van Steenbergen and teammate Stan Ockers (Girardengo) were seen as the best Belgian entrants with general classification chances. Milan–San Remo winner Loretto Petrucci (Bianchi) was known to ride for Coppi, but there were thoughts that he would be able to attack after the Dolomites.

The Nilux team featured three Australian riders, who may have been the first Australian riders to participate in the race. The Torpado team featured famed Spanish riders Bernardo Ruiz and Jesús Loroño. It was noted that top French riders at the time were lacking from the race's start list, although Raphaël Géminiani (Bianchi) did participate as a support for Coppi. Géminiani had finished second at the 1951 Tour de France and had the reputation of a climber. Tour de Romandie winner Wout Wagtmans (Garin) was set to ride the Giro, but withdrew at the last moment. It was speculated to be a battle between Swiss and Italian riders.

Route and stages

The route was revealed on 29 February 1952. The race route contained twenty stages, of which two were individual time trials, as well as three rest days. There were twelve categorized climbs that awarded points for the mountains classification across seven stages.

The route was thought to give chances of success to all types of riders as there were several flat stages, "mixed" stages, time trials, and mountainous stages. The first time trial was flat, while the second had a final  that was downhill. The eleventh and nineteenth stages were seen as the most important. The eleventh leg featured three climbs as the race traveled from Venice to Bolzano and climbed the Falzarego, Pordoi Pass, and Passo Sella. Camoriano wrote when the route was announced that the route was open and good for those that are "capable and complete."

Classification leadership

One jersey was worn during the 1953 Giro d'Italia. The leader of the general classification – calculated by adding the stage finish times of each rider – wore a pink jersey. This classification is the most important of the race, and its winner is considered as the winner of the Giro.

Additionally, the highest ranked cyclist riding with a licence for independents was identified by the white jersey; at the end of the Giro this was Donato Zampini. Another classification was calculated in the same method, but was exclusive to foreign riders and awarded a green jersey.
The mountains classification leader wore no leader's jersey. There was one category for mountains which awarded 6, 4, 3, 2, and 1 point to the first riders to cross. Although no jersey was awarded, there was also one classification for the teams, in which the stage finish times of the best three cyclists per team were added; the leading team was the one with the lowest total time.

Final standings

General classification

Independent rider classification

Mountains classification

Team classification

Kubler was the highest ranked non-Italian rider.

Bibliography

References

Citations

1952
1952 in Italian sport
1952 in road cycling
May 1952 sports events in Europe
June 1952 sports events in Europe
1952 Challenge Desgrange-Colombo